João Baptista N'Tyamba (born 20 March 1968) is an Angolan runner. He was born in Lubango.

He started as a middle-distance runner and competed in the 800 meters at 1988 Summer Olympics. He then competed in the 1500 metres at the 1991 World Championships, the 1992 Summer Olympics, and the 1996 Summer Olympics and, in 3000 metres, at the 1995 IAAF World Indoor Championships. He never reached the final in any of these events.

He then shifted to the longer distances, competing in 10,000 metres at the World Championships in 1997, 1999, and 2001, with a thirteenth place from 1999 as his best finish. He competed in the marathon at two consecutive Olympic Games, placing seventeenth in 2000 and 53rd in 2004.

N'Tyamba holds the Angolan records in 800 metres, 1000 metres, 1500 metres, 3000 metres, 10,000 metres, half marathon, and marathon.

When N'Tyamba competed in the marathon at 2008 Olympics he became the first male track and field athlete to compete at six Olympics. The other track and field athletes who have competed at six Olympics are Merlene Ottey, Lia Manoliu, Tessa Sanderson, and Maria Mutola.

Achievements

References

External links
 

1968 births
Living people
Angolan male middle-distance runners
Angolan male long-distance runners
Athletes (track and field) at the 1988 Summer Olympics
Athletes (track and field) at the 1992 Summer Olympics
Athletes (track and field) at the 1996 Summer Olympics
Athletes (track and field) at the 2000 Summer Olympics
Athletes (track and field) at the 2004 Summer Olympics
Athletes (track and field) at the 2008 Summer Olympics
Olympic athletes of Angola
People from Lubango
Athletes (track and field) at the 2003 All-Africa Games
African Games competitors for Angola